Alefia Kapadia is an Indian television actress. She has done many roles in various Indian television shows. She made her television debut in Just Mohabbat, followed by Daaman. She has been also seen in episodics like Star Bestsellers, Rishtey, C.I.D. Apart from these are Pyaar Ka Dard Hai Meetha Meetha Pyaara Pyaara, SuperCops vs Supervillains, Hamari Sister Didi, She had also bagged two shows, Savdhaan India and Aahat. She has done her recent role in Laut Aao Trisha.

Filmography

Television Shows

Films

Career  

 Alefia started her modeling career in the 1990s, when she was a teenager. 
 She appeared in Remo Fernandes' music video, O Meri Munni.
 She appeared in a short film, Stolen Heart, in 2014.

Bike & Road Trip Event / Show 
Alefia took part in Mahindra Mojo Road Trip.

References

External links 

 Alefia Kapadia official website
 
 Alefia Kapadia on Instagram

Living people
Indian television actresses
Actresses from Mumbai
Year of birth missing (living people)